The Gamut is an album by American jazz drummer Chico Hamilton featuring performances recorded in 1968 and originally released on the Solid State label.

Reception
Allmusic gave the album 2 stars.

Track listing
 "Daht-Doo-Dah" (Chico Hamilton) - 2:48
 "The Second Time Around" (Sammy Cahn, Jimmy Van Heusen) - 3:00
 "Jonathan's Theme" (Jeannie Cheatham, Jimmy Cheatham) - 2:35
 "People Will Say We're in Love" (Richard Rodgers, Oscar Hammerstein II) - 4:00
 "Blow, Jim, Blow" (Hamilton, Jimmy Cheatham, Jimmy Cleveland) - 4:31
 "Third Wing on the Left Side of an Eagle" (Jimmy Cheatham) - 3:23
 "Broadway" (Billy Bird, Henri Woode, Teddy McRae) - 2:51
 "MSP" (Hamilton, Jimmy Cheatham, Steve Potts) - 5:22
 "Theme for a Woman" (Hamilton, Jimmy Cheatham) - 6:10

Personnel
Chico Hamilton - drums
Danny Banks - flute
Steve Potts - alto saxophone
Russell Andrews - tenor saxophone
Jimmy Cleveland, Britt Woodman, William Cambell - trombone
Jimmy Cheatham - bass trombone, arranger
Jan Arnet - bass 
Jackie Arnold - voice

References 

Solid State Records (jazz label) albums
Chico Hamilton albums
1968 albums